State Route 18 (abbreviated SR 18) is a primary state highway in south-central West Tennessee.  SR 18 is a two-lane facility throughout the majority of its length through the state with the exception being in Bolivar, Tennessee.  SR 18 has a short concurrency with US 64 and also with SR 125 at Bolivar.

Route description

Fayette County

SR 18 begins in extreme southeastern Fayette County in West Tennessee at the northern terminus of Mississippi Highway 7, approximately 1.2 miles north of Michigan City, Mississippi as a rural two lane route.  This route continues in a northeasterly direction through rural Fayette County and briefly overlaps SR 57 at the communities of La Grange and Grand Junction near the Hardeman county line.

Hardeman County

At Bolivar, SR 18 continues its northeasterly trek through the city as Tennessee Street and is also overlapped with US 64.  SR 18 is a four-lane undivided highway while overlapped with US 64 and passes nearby the site of the Western State Mental Health Institute on the western outskirts of the city.  At the Hardeman County Courthouse, SR 18 breaks away from US 64 and turns left on North Main Street.  Also at this location, SR 125 begins a  hidden overlap with SR 18 at the courthouse.  Outside the Bolivar city limits, SR 18/SR 125 continue north through the Hatchie River bottoms before reaching the community of Shandy.  At Shandy, the SR 18 & SR 125 overlap ends with SR 125 turning north on Silerton Road toward Chickasaw State Park.  SR 18 in northern Hardeman County traverses sparsely populated farmland and swampland and intersects with SR 138 and SR 100.  The junction of SR 18 & SR 100 is a grade-separated diamond interchange where SR 18 expands briefly to a four-lane divided highway.  North of this intersection, SR 18 resumes its northbound routing towards Jackson as a rural two-lane highway.

Madison County

SR 18 continues as a two-lane route through rural southwestern Madison County and passes through the community of Medon and Malesus just south of the Jackson city limits.  In Jackson, the route ends at an expansive signalized intersection with US 45 and hidden SR 5, known locally as South Highland Avenue.

History
Little has changed along SR 18 since its designation as a state route.  Prior to 1981, SR 18 had one alternate route near Grand Junction which was originally signed as State Route 18A.  This entire route was renamed to what is now known as Tennessee State Route 368.

SR 18 roughly follows the original route of the Mississippi Central Railroad.

Future
In Hardeman County, an Environmental Impact Statement is currently underway to determine the feasibility of widening SR 18 from its current two-lane status to a divided four-lane highway.  This work is part of a larger effort by TDOT to widen SR 18 from Bolivar north to Jackson as directed in House Joint Resolution 16 of the 98th Tennessee General Assembly.

Major intersections

References

External links
Tennessee Department of Transportation

018
Transportation in Fayette County, Tennessee
Transportation in Hardeman County, Tennessee
Transportation in Madison County, Tennessee
Jackson metropolitan area, Tennessee